Coppa Italia Serie D (Italian for Serie D Italian Cup) is a straight knock-out based competition involving teams from Serie D in Italian football. All games, including the final, are on a home/away basis. The competition has been held since the 1999/00, when Serie D clubs split from Coppa Italia Dilettanti, a tournament that was opened also to teams from Eccellenza and Promozione.

Short Regulation 

The preliminary round, the first round, the thirty-second team round, the sixteenth round, the first knockout round and the quarterfinals will be played with one-way races. The semifinals and the final matches only will be played with return race.
In the event of a tie at the end of the meetings, no overtime will be played but it will pull directly on penalties. For the semi-final and final games, if it is a tie in aggregate, additional penalties are provided.

Preliminary round 

The preliminary round consists of one-leg 47 matches between the following teams: 
 36 companies newly promoted
 6 companies relegated from Lega Pro Seconda Divisione
 17 companies winning the play-out in 2011-2012 and these finished with a gap of more than 8 points.
 3 companies finished (Darfo Boario, Fortis Juventus and Cynthia)
 3 companies from Lega Pro Prima Divisione (Foggia, Taranto Real and Spal)
 28 companies which finished at the end of the 2011-2012 season on the twelfth, eleventh and tenth place in groups C, E, F, G, H, I, and on the fourteenth, thirteenth, twelfth and eleventh place in groups A, B, D.
 1 team that had the most penalties as selected by Coppa Disciplina (Gladiator)

|}

First round
The second round consists of 55 one-leg matches between the following teams:
47 teams winning the preliminary round
63 of the remaining teams, except the 9 companies compete in Coppa Italia (Arezzo, Chieri, Marino, Cosenza, Este, Delta Porto Tolle, Pontisola, Sambenedettese, Sarnese).

|}

Second round
The second round consists of 32 one-leg matches between the following teams:
55 teams winning the first round
9 companies which competed in Coppa Italia (Arezzo, Chieri, Marino, Cosenza, Este, Delta Porto Tolle, Pontisola, Sambenedettese, Sarnese).

|}

Third round
The third round consists of 16 one-leg matches between the following teams:
32 teams winning the second round

|}

Fourth round
The fourth round consists of 8 one-leg matches between the following teams:
16 teams winning the second round

|}

Quarterfinals
Quarterfinals consist of 4 one-leg matches between the following teams:
8 teams winning the second round

|}

Semifinals
Semifinals consist of 2 two-leg matches between the following teams:
4 teams winning quarterfinals

|}

Final
Final consists of one-leg match between the following teams:
2 teams winning semifinals

|}

Footnotes

4
Coppa Italia Serie D